Adam Pettersson (born January 13, 1992) is a Swedish professional ice hockey player, currently playing with Modo Hockey in the HockeyAllsvenskan (Allsv).

Playing career
The Central Scouting Bureau ranked Pettersson ninth among European Skaters for the 2010 NHL Entry Draft, however he went undrafted. Pettersson spent the first 10 years of his professional career within hometown club, Skellefteå AIK of the SHL, before leaving as a free agent following the 2019–20 season.

On 14 April 2020, he agreed to a two-year contract to continue in the SHL with Brynäs IF.

Career statistics

Regular season and playoffs

International

Awards and honors

References

External links

1992 births
Living people
Brynäs IF players
Skellefteå AIK players
IF Sundsvall Hockey players
Swedish ice hockey centres
People from Skellefteå Municipality
Sportspeople from Västerbotten County